On September 4, 1968, following several days of violent clashes, Alphonse Massamba-Débat's government was overthrown by the military who forced Massamba-Débat to resign. Alfred Raoul then became the acting head of state until January 1969 when Marien Ngouabi, the chairman of the same party that had brought Massamba-Débat to power, assumed control.

References

1968 in the Republic of the Congo
Republic of the Congo
Military coups in the Republic of the Congo
1960s coups d'état and coup attempts
September 1968 events in Africa